Valaškovce is a municipality and former village and  in Humenné District in the Prešov Region of north-east Slovakia.

History

External links
http://www.statistics.sk/mosmis/eng/run.html

Villages and municipalities in Humenné District
Former villages in Slovakia